Parasan  is a village and later it became Parasan VDC which is now in Punarbas Municipality in Kanchanpur District in Sudurpashchim Province of south-western Nepal. The former village development committee was merged to form a new municipality on 18 May 2014. At the time of the 1991 Nepal census it had a population of 9796 people living in 1615 individual households.

Economy
Parasan has been one of the village development committees which have been subject to the Nepali government's Land Reform Program, which was launched in 1964.

References

Populated places in Kanchanpur District